Września Miasto (English: Września City) was a narrow-gauge railway stop in Września, Greater Poland Voivodeship, Poland.

It was a part of the Wrzesińska Kolej Powiatowa (en. Września District Railway). It was located on the square at the intersection of today's Kaliska and Wrocławska streets (at what is now a Shell petrol station), in Zawodzie. The stop was founded in 1898 and operated until 1976.

See also
 Września Wąskotorowa (railway station)
 Września (railway station)

External links
 Description of stations (Polish)

Sources
 Marian Torzewski (red.): Września. Historia miasta. Muzeum Regionalne im. Dzieci Wrzesińskich we Wrześni, Września, 2006, s. 227-229 i 347

Railway stations in Poland opened in 1898
Września
Railway stations in Greater Poland Voivodeship
Disused railway stations in Poland
Railway stations closed in 1976
1976 disestablishments in Poland